Yola d'Avril (8 April 1906 – 2 March 1984) was a French-American actress, who appeared in numerous productions between 1925 and 1953. She was also known as Yola Vermairion and Yola d'Avril Montiague.

Biography
d'Avril was born in Lille, France, and died in Port Hueneme, California as Yola d'Avril Montiague. During World War I, her family relocated to Paris. After her father died in 1923, she moved to Los Angeles. She appeared in MGM's adventure film, Tarzan and His Mate with Italian actor Paul Porcasi as her father, Monsieur Feronde.

Partial filmography

 The Dressmaker from Paris (1925) - Mannequin (uncredited)
 The War Horse (1927) - Yvonne
 Orchids and Ermine (1927) - Telephone Operator
 The Tender Hour (1927) - Cabaret Girl
 Hard-Boiled Haggerty (1927) - Cafe Dancer
 Smile, Brother, Smile (1927) - Daisy
 American Beauty (1927) - Telephone Girl
 The Valley of the Giants (1927) - Felice
 The Noose (1928) - Cabaret Girl
 Lady Be Good (1928) - Assistant
 Vamping Venus (1928) - Stenographer
 Three-Ring Marriage (1928) - Minnie
 The Awakening (1928) - (uncredited)
 House of Horror (1929) - Bit Role (uncredited)
 She Goes to War (1929) - Yvette
 Shanghai Lady (1929) - Lizzie
 The Love Parade (1929) - Paulette (uncredited)
 Hot for Paris (1929) - Yola Dupre
 Double Cross Roads (1930) - Happy Max's Moll (uncredited)
 King of Jazz (1930) - Automobile Owner's Wife ("Springtime") / Marie ("All Noisy on the Eastern Front") (uncredited)
 All Quiet on the Western Front (1930) - Suzanne (uncredited)
 The Bad One (1930) - Gida
 New Movietone Follies of 1930 (1930) - Maid
 Born Reckless (1930) - French Girl
 Those Three French Girls (1930) - Diane
 Just Like Heaven (1930) - Fifi
 The Truth About Youth (1930) - Babette - Kara's Maid (uncredited)
 The Right of Way (1931) - Suzette
 God's Gift to Women (1931) - Dagmar
 Svengali (1931) - Maid (uncredited)
 Just a Gigolo (1931) - Pauline
 The Common Law (1931) - Fifi
 Women Go on Forever (1931) - Pearl
 The Last Flight (1931) - French Party Girl at Cafe (uncredited)
 Suicide Fleet (1931) - French Girl in Tangiers (uncredited)
 Cock of the Air (1932) - Italian Girl #2
 Sky Devils (1932) - Fifi
 Beauty and the Boss (1932) - Girl in Bath Tub (uncredited)
 The Man from Yesterday (1932) - Tony's Cocotte
 A Passport to Hell (1932) - Rosita
 A Parisian Romance (1932) - Pauline
 Diplomaniacs (1933) - French Vamp (uncredited)
 The Cat and the Fiddle (1934) - Maid in House (uncredited)
 Glamour (1934) - Renee
 Tarzan and His Mate (1934) - Madame Feronde (uncredited)
 Monte Carlo Nights (1934) - Madelon
 Kansas City Princess (1934) - French Manicurist (uncredited)
 Straight from the Heart (1935) - French Girl in Taxi (uncredited)
 Captain Blood (1935) - Girl in Tavern (uncredited)
 I Met Him in Paris (1937) - French Wife in Room 617
 The Hurricane (1937) - Club Hibiscus Singer [Sings 'I Can't Give You Anything But Love' in French] (uncredited)
 Gone with the Wind (1939) - Belle's Girl (uncredited)
 Green Hell (1940) - Native Girl (uncredited)
 I Was an Adventuress (1940) - Frenchwoman at Party (uncredited)
 The Lady Has Plans (1942) - Hotel Maid (uncredited)
 Night in New Orleans (1942) - Mme. Lamballe
 A Passport to Hell (1942) - Celestine (uncredited)
 Monsieur Beaucaire (1946) - Housekeeper (uncredited)
 Cloak and Dagger (1946) - First Nurse (uncredited)
 Sorry, Wrong Number (1948) - French Maid (uncredited)
 Red Ball Express (1952) - Barmaid (uncredited)
 Little Boy Lost (1953) - Madame Le Blanc (uncredited) (final film role)

References

External links

Yola d'Avril at Virtual History

In Loving Memory Of Yola d'Avril

1984 deaths
20th-century American actresses
American film actresses
French emigrants to the United States
Mass media people from Lille
People from Port Hueneme, California
1906 births